The Uruguay Department (in Spanish, Departamento Uruguay) is an administrative subdivision (departamento) of the province of Entre Ríos, Argentina. It is located in the south-east of the province, beside the Uruguay River.

The head town is Concepción del Uruguay.

References

Departments of Entre Ríos Province